The Fiat 510 is a passenger car produced by Fiat between 1920 and 1925. It was of a similar design than the smaller 501 and 505 models. Starting from 1920, a sports version 510 S with a more powerful engine and shorter chassis was made. Around 14,000 examples were produced.

Engines

References
Fiat Personenwagen, by Fred Steiningen, 1994. 

510
Cars introduced in 1920